Sophie de Choiseul-Gouffier née Zofia Tyzenhauz (1790 – 28 May 1878) was a Polish-Lithuania novelist, writing in French. She married Antoine Louis Octave de Choiseul-Gouffier, a French noble in service of Napoleon after the French invasion of Russia in 1812 and owner of Plateliai manor. She is one of the first female writers in Lithuania. Her novels are inspired from the life of females in contemporary Lithuanian nobility. She was buried on cemetery des Champeaux in Montmorency.

Publications 

 Le Polonois à St. Domingue ou La jeune Créole, Warsaw, 1818
 Barbe Radziwill. Roman historique, Paris, 1820
 Vladislas Jagellon et Hedwige, ou la réunion de la Lithuanie à la Pologne. Nouvelle historique, Paris, 1824
 Le nain politque. Roman historique, Paris 1827
 Mémoires historiques sur l'empereur Alexandre et la cour de Russie, Paris 1829
 Halina Ogińska ou les Suédois en Pologne, Paris 1839
 Réminiscences sur l'empereur Alexandre Ier et sur l'empereur Napoléon Ier, Paris, 1862

References

1790 births
1878 deaths
19th-century French women writers
19th-century Lithuanian nobility
19th-century Lithuanian women writers
19th-century Polish women writers
Polish writers in French